Robert John Herman Kiphuth (November 17, 1890 – January 7, 1967) was an American swimming coach and college athletics administrator. He served as the head men's swimming coach at  Yale University for 41 years, from 1918 to 1959. During his tenure with Bulldogs swimming and diving, he amassed a record of 520 wins to only 12 losses, along with four NCAA titles (1942, 1944, 1951, 1953), earning him a reputation for being the winningest coach in history.

Kiphuth also served as the head coach for multiple U.S. Olympic swimming teams (both men and women, depending on the year). From 1947 to 1949, he doubled as Yale's athletic director. He was largely responsible for the modern sport of swimming, which he shaped by introducing such innovations (now standard practices) as dryland workouts and interval training.

From 1951 to 1961, Kiphuth was the publisher of Swimming World Magazine.

Kiphuth was awarded the Presidential Medal of Freedom by President Lyndon Johnson on December 6, 1963. He had been chosen to receive the award by President John F. Kennedy (President Kennedy also received the Medal of Freedom, posthumously, at the same ceremony).

Since 1968, the high-point award at the USA's Swimming National Championships has been named in his honor (the "Kiphuth Award").

In 1965 he was inducted into the International Swimming Hall of Fame.

Kiphurth died on January 7, 1967, in New Haven, Connecticut, after suffering a heart attack.

See also
 List of members of the International Swimming Hall of Fame
 Wayne Moore (swimmer)

References

External links
 

1967 deaths
1890 births
American swimming coaches
Yale Bulldogs athletic directors
Yale Bulldogs swimming coaches
Yale University faculty
Presidential Medal of Freedom recipients
People from Tonawanda, New York